Lac du Jotty is a reservoir at La Baume in Haute-Savoie, France.

Jotty, Lac